Charles Edward Cowan (June 19, 1938 – April 29, 1998) was an American football offensive tackle who played fifteen seasons in the National Football League (NFL) with the Los Angeles Rams from 1961 to 1975. Cowan was a huge intimidating presence alongside Hall of Famer Tom Mack from 1966 to 1975, with Ken Iman at center from 1965 to 1975. In that 1961 to 1975 span, the Rams made the playoffs 5 times (1967, 1969, 1973, 1974, 1975), reaching the NFC championship game of the 1974-75 NFL playoffs and the 1975-76 NFL playoffs, but losing to the Minnesota Vikings and to the Dallas Cowboys, respectively. In the 1974 divisional round, the Rams defeated the Washington Redskins, as Cowan was successful against the opposing the right defensive end Verlon Biggs. In the 1975 divisional round, Doug France started in his place as the Rams defeated the St. Louis Cardinals. Cowan came back to play against the Cowboys, his final game, as the Rams could not get past them. Cowan was replaced by Doug France in 1976.

References

1938 births
1998 deaths
People from Logan County, West Virginia
American football offensive tackles
Los Angeles Rams players
Western Conference Pro Bowl players
National Conference Pro Bowl players
New Mexico Highlands Cowboys football players
Burials at Rose Hills Memorial Park